

Episcopal Conference of the Pacific

Ecclesiastical Province of Agaña

Archdiocese of Agaña
Diocese of Caroline Islands
Diocese of Chalan Kanoa
Prefecture of the Marshall Islands

Ecclesiastical Province of Nouméa

Archdiocese of Nouméa
Diocese of Port-Vila
Diocese of Wallis et Futuna

Ecclesiastical Province of Papeete

Archdiocese of Papeete
Diocese of Taiohae o Tefenuaenata

Ecclesiastical Province of Samoa-Apia

Archdiocese of Samoa-Apia
Diocese of Samoa-Pago Pago
Mission Sui Iuris of Tokelau

Ecclesiastical Province of Suva
Archdiocese of Suva
Diocese of Rarotonga
Diocese of Tarawa and Nauru
Mission Sui Iuris of Funafuti

Immediate Subject to the Holy See
Roman Catholic Diocese of Tonga

Pacific